WDDO (980 AM) is a Christian radio station broadcasting a gospel music format, with programming provided mostly from the Sheridan Gospel Network. Licensed to Perry, Georgia, United States, the station is currently owned by The Glory Media Group, LLC.

External links

Radio stations established in 1956
DDO (AM)
1956 establishments in Georgia (U.S. state)
Gospel radio stations in the United States